Trevor van Riemsdyk (born July 24, 1991) is an American professional ice hockey defenseman for the Washington Capitals of the National Hockey League (NHL). He won the Stanley Cup in 2015, his rookie season, with the Chicago Blackhawks and has also played for the Carolina Hurricanes.

Playing career

Amateur
Van Riemsdyk played high school hockey for Christian Brothers Academy in Lincroft, New Jersey. He left the school before his senior year to play for the New Hampshire Junior Monarchs of the Eastern Junior Hockey League (EJHL).

Van Riemsdyk played college hockey with the University of New Hampshire in the NCAA Men's Division I Hockey East conference. In his sophomore year, van Riemsdyk's outstanding play was rewarded with a selection to the 2012–13 All-Hockey East First Team.

Professional
On March 24, 2014, van Riemsdyk agreed to terms with the Chicago Blackhawks on a two-year, entry-level deal. He made his NHL debut on October 9, 2014, against the Dallas Stars.

On November 9, 2014, van Riemsdyk earned his first NHL point with an assist in a 5–2 victory over the San Jose Sharks. On February 25, 2015, van Riemsdyk was moved from the Blackhawks to their American Hockey League (AHL) affiliate, the Rockford IceHogs, after recovering from a fractured patella suffered on November 19. Shortly after recovering, van Riemsdyk injured his wrist in April 2015 while playing for Rockford. He underwent successful surgery but missed two months whilst rehabilitating. Van Riemsdyk was recalled by the Blackhawks on May 22. He made his playoff debut on June 8 in game three of the 2015 Stanley Cup Finals. Van Riemsdyk won his first Stanley Cup in his rookie season, as the Blackhawks defeated the Tampa Bay Lightning in six games.

On July 7, 2015, van Riemsdyk signed a two-year contract extension to remain with the Blackhawks. In the 2015–16 season, on October 10, 2015, van Riemsdyk scored his first NHL career goal against Jean-François Bérubé of the New York Islanders.

On April 23, 2016, van Riemsdyk scored his first NHL career playoff goal in Game 6 in the first round of the 2016 playoffs against the St. Louis Blues.

Having been exposed by the Blackhawks at the 2017 NHL Expansion Draft, van Riemsdyk was selected by the Vegas Golden Knights on June 21, 2017. The following day, he was traded by the Golden Knights along with a seventh-round pick in the 2018 NHL Entry Draft to the Carolina Hurricanes in exchange for a second-round pick in the 2017 NHL Entry Draft. On July 5, 2018, he signed a two-year, $4.6 million contract extension with the Hurricanes.

After three seasons with the Hurricanes, van Riemsdyk left as a free agent to sign a one-year, $800,000 contract with the Washington Capitals on October 11, 2020. On March 21, 2021, van Riemsdyk signed a two-year, $1.9 million extension with the Capitals.

In the  season while in the midst of recording new career highs offensively for the second consecutive season, van Riemsdyk was re-signed to a three-year, $9 million contract extension on March 11, 2023.

Personal life
He is the younger brother of James van Riemsdyk who plays in the NHL for the Philadelphia Flyers. A third brother, Brendan van Riemsdyk, played hockey at New Hampshire before transferring to Northeastern. The boys were born to Frans and Allison van Riemsdyk. Frans was born in the Netherlands and raised in New Jersey.

Career statistics

Regular season and playoffs

International

Awards and honors

References

External links
 

1991 births
Living people
AHCA Division I men's ice hockey All-Americans
American men's ice hockey defensemen
American people of Dutch descent
Carolina Hurricanes players
Chicago Blackhawks players
Christian Brothers Academy (New Jersey) alumni
Ice hockey players from New Jersey
New Hampshire Wildcats men's ice hockey players
People from Middletown Township, New Jersey
Rockford IceHogs (AHL) players
Sportspeople from Monmouth County, New Jersey
Stanley Cup champions
Undrafted National Hockey League players
Washington Capitals players